Anywhere is the first full-length studio album by American psychedelic rock/folk project Anywhere. Limited edition vinyl (500 copies) was released by ATP Recordings on April 21, 2012 exclusively for Record Store Day, while widespread CD and LP releases followed on June 4 in UK and July 24 in United States.

According to the band's bio on ATP Recordings site, "the music captured on this material is an ethereal, resonant execution of what could be described as eastern acoustic punk. Likened to the voyeurism of Sandy Bull, Sir Richard Bishop, or Jack Rose style raga's reinterpreted at times with Drive Like Jehu, Minutemen punk velocity, other moments emotionally spiraling toward a haunting, ethereal beauty akin to Vashti Bunyan lost in the desert of a desolate western. Blending acoustic and minimal electric guitars with a multitude of percussion instrumentation, digital tabla machines, sci-fi electronics and feedback, this avant garde collective of envelope pushing splatter artists have created a new presence. Modern mantras of electric silence that fuse consciousness into a recording of vibrant, transitional material, blending geographic as well as cultural diversity. The sound of stillness amidst chaos, light below the depths, dancing full circle into the center of what could only be called Anywhere".

Track listing

Personnel
Anywhere
Christian Eric Beaulieu – guitars, bass, percussion, electronics
Cedric Bixler-Zavala – vocals (3,5,6), drums, percussion, electronics
Mike Watt – bass
Rachel Fannan – vocals (2, 4)
Toshi Kasai – keys

Engineering
Toshi Kasai – recording and mixing engineer
Phil Becker, Mike Watt, Evan Weiss – additional recording
Justin Weiss – mastering

Artwork
Sonny Kay – album art, design
Alan Forbes – logo
Christina Bixler – photos

References

External links
Anywhere (album) on ATP Recordings website

2012 debut albums
Anywhere (band) albums